Czajków  is a village in the administrative district of Gmina Blizanów, within Kalisz County, Greater Poland Voivodeship, in central Poland.

History
During the German occupation of Poland (World War II), in 1942, the occupiers carried out expulsions of Poles, who were deported to forced labour in Germany and German-annexed Austria, while their houses and farms were handed over to German colonists as part of the Lebensraum policy.

References

Villages in Kalisz County